Piracy was a phenomenon that was not limited to the Caribbean region. Golden Age pirates roamed off the coast of North America, Africa and the Caribbean.

Background 

Pirates and sailors are important in understanding how the Atlantic world looked and worked. Defying traditional alliances, attacking and capturing merchant vessels of all nations, pirates wreaked havoc on an emerging economic system, disrupted trade routes and created a crisis within an increasingly important system of trade centered on the Atlantic world. They were ready and willing participants in the exchange of people, ideas, and commodities around the Atlantic basin affecting the creation and destruction of communities.

Trade routes along the Middle Passage were one of the main cogs in establishing what is known as capitalism today. For pirates in the Atlantic World, trade routes are fortuitous, because of the vast wealth they supply in the way of cargo that moved along the Middle Passage. From 1715 to 1728, pirate activity created problems for merchant ships along the trade routes, thus halting growth during that period. As piracy along the Middle Passage increased, so did the need for owners of the merchant vessels to insure the cargo on board their ships, because not only was there threat of loss from natural disaster, there was the chance the cargo could be lost to plundering pirates. "The genius of insurance," in the way it contributes to finance capitalism, is the insistence that the real test of something's value comes not at the moment it is made or exchanged, but at the moment it is lost or destroyed.

Pirates, buccaneers, and privateers

Pirates are often equated in the modern mind with privateers and buccaneers, but neither label accurately describes piracy during the early eighteenth century.  Each of these terms describes men who loot ships or settlements.  The difference lies in the amount of societal acceptance that these men were afforded.

Buccaneers were a cross between genuine privateers commissioned to defend a country’s colonies and trade, and outright pirates. The buccaneers were originally of French origin and usually pillaged the Caribbean islands and along the coasts of Central America, Venezuela, and Colombia from the 1630s to the 1690s. Alexander Exquemelin enlisted with the buccaneers and wrote about the bold feats of raids as they disrupted shipping on the high seas and terrorized Caribbean settlements. His book, De Americaensche Zee-Roovers (The Buccaneers of America) is one of the few first-hand accounts of the life and actions of the buccaneers. Many buccaneers raided trading routes across the Atlantic and within the Caribbean. The Buccaneers had many successful people but probably the most famous was Henry Morgan. Morgan was responsible for raids in Cuba, Panama, and Venezuela. Like many buccaneers, Morgan was based in Port Royal, Jamaica. In 1670 Morgan led a fleet of thirty-six ships and 1,846 men, the largest fleet of pirates or privateers ever assembled in Caribbean history.

Privateers were sanctioned by their respective governments to raid enemy vessels. The colonization of the Atlantic saw many conflicts among the various colonizing European nations; raids by privateers was one way to gain an advantage over rivals. The captains of these ships were given letters of marque by their governments, intended to validate all actions against the enemy.

The pirates of the early eighteenth century, however, were men who acted on their own apart from official political sanction.  Pirates were very specific, unauthorized entities who worked outside the more socially accepted scenarios and did not discriminate when conducting their raids. The act of piracy was "massively" criminal.  Laws against piracy were often very strict, with charges and punishments escalating in attempts to curb piratical actions. But many braved the consequences of being caught if it meant a life lived more freely.

The Golden Age of Piracy

"The Golden Age of Piracy" is a term used by historians to refer to the most widespread increase of "sea banditry" on record. Although scholars agree that there was a boom in raiding and pillaging activities in the early eighteenth century, there are various schools of thought regarding the length of time that was the Golden Age.  The shortest amount of time that is agreed upon is from around 1715 to 1725.  The signing of the Treaty of Utrecht ended the War of Spanish Succession, ending the authorized privateering that was a part of the war and marking the beginning of the Golden Age of Piracy. Another group holds that the Golden Age was from around 1690 to about 1725. The longest definition of the Golden Age runs from 1650 to 1726, to include the buccaneers and other piracy endeavors.

History

Before the Golden Age of Piracy
European-based piracy of the modern era began in the "Atlantic Triangle".  This common area of oceangoing commerce between Seville & Cadiz, the Azores Islands, and the northwest coast of Africa, encompassing Madeira and the Canary Islands was haunted by both European, as well as the Berber Coast pirates of North Africa throughout the sixteenth century. As consistent trade increased between Spain and Portugal and the East and West Indies, respectively, so did piracy. What Spain and Portugal would call piracy was often sponsored by, even if only at times marginally, monarchs such as Queen Elizabeth I and King Edward VI. Most popular in this era of privateers was Francis Drake. Drake raided Spanish settlements and shipping in the South Sea shores of present-day Peru, Chile, Brazil, and Venezuela, along the coasts of Central America. This era was notable for beginning somewhat regular long-term visits to the west Coast of the Americas and further to the East Indies, often after stopping in West Africa to attack slave ships or towns. Dutch merchants were active in the Caribbean, mining salt and dyewoods on the coast of Brazil. This activity lead to dozens of raids along the West Coast of the Americas and to the formation of the West India Company which had semi-legal standing as privateers. This large continuous harassment incensed Spain and put their inhabitants in fear. By the turn of the seventeenth century this vast expansion of the Dutch had formed colonies in the East Indies and soon they started feeling as well the wrath of piracy. Shortly buccaneers followed in the seventeenth century. These bandits mostly raided land settlements. They were "embittered Dutch sailors", "abandoned French colonists", "abused English, Scots, and Irish indentures."

Geographic area
Pirates, during what is called the "Golden Age of Piracy" of the late seventeenth century and early eighteenth century operated on a truly global scale.

Caribbean

North Atlantic
Most of the pirates known during this period originated from Europe. Much of the known pirate activity that took place in the Northern Atlantic was along the Eastern Seaboard of Canada and the US mainland, from Newfoundland to the Florida Keys. Newfoundland fisheries were known as recruiting areas for pirates in the early eighteenth century. Black Bart Roberts had a run-in off the coast of Newfoundland as well. There he captured Samuel Cary, who gave an in-depth account of the event to a Boston newspaper. New York was a popular place for pirates to unload their goods. During the first quarter century of 1700s, one of the best known events is Blackbeard's blockade of Charleston's port often acknowledged as the pirate wars of South Carolina.

Africa
Africa was intimately tied to the economy of the Caribbean. Responsible for fueling the sailors that pirates preyed on, the sugar plantations of the Caribbean, and European colonies on the American mainland, traffic from Africa was routinely targeted by pirates. On numerous occasions, mutinous slave ship crews turned pirate. Bartholomew Roberts wreaked havoc for traders of all goods on the west coast of Africa.

As capitalism developed as an economic system in early modern Europe, overseas colonies became increasingly important in the Atlantic "triangular trade" system. Labor-intensive colonial plantations generated a need to find a stable, long-term labor force. Indentured servants posed a problem in that they had legal rights and could eventually become a competing force. The advantages of slave labor in comparison with the disadvantages of indentured servitude contributed to the growth of the European slave trade. Pirates were frequently a thorn in the side of European merchant companies in Africa such as the Royal African Company (RAC). They disrupted the flow of labor and capital by attacking, capturing and sometimes destroying slave ships. Pirate captains often absorbed captured slaves into their crews, and Black persons, both African and African American made up a substantial part of the pirate vanguard. The pirate's disruption of the transatlantic slave trade declined after the end of the Golden Age of Piracy, which led to an increase in the trade by the mid-18th century.

The Atlantic slave trade/Middle Passage was just as much a part of life in the Atlantic as was the merchant shipping of goods. Many European powers became involved in the transatlantic slave trade by at least the eighteenth century; countries like Portugal, Sweden, Netherlands, France, and Britain all had outposts on the African coast. European slave traders would conduct their business with the larger African tribes who would buy weapons from the Europeans and in turn use them to collect members of other tribes to sell to slave captains. Once in the hands of a slaver, the slave represented a substantial investment as Ian Baucom suggests, by the insuring of slaves purchased. Some European cities such as Liverpool would become successful from operating in this trade system, and would drive the slave market to handle as much business as was possible.

With slaving remaining an open and competitive business, there existed both what Rediker calls a "fort trade" and a "ship trade." Slaves were kidnapped and brought to forts where they would be held by the local authorities until bought and shipped out. While the ship trade refers to captains making stops along the African coast at points where there was not a European presence to gather up the slaves themselves; they would also stock up on the necessary provisions for the Middle Passage at these stops.

The captives were not the only ones who were mistreated on slave ships, as Rediker points out the lash "operated without regard to race, age, gender, law, or humanity. Many of the sailors were beaten mercilessly when they would refuse to beat the slaves as harshly as the captain wanted or at all. A sailor could make roughly one to one and a half thousand dollars in current pay, which back in the eighteenth century was a fairly large sum of money for a single trip.

Pirate havens

Marcus Rediker argues pirates followed a lucrative trade and sought bases for their depredations in areas that were "distant from the seats of imperial power". Pirate havens such as the Bahamian Islands began to attract pirates by the hundreds because no government existed. Matthew Frick also argues "near-autonomous nature of a feral city" along with "geographic position accessible to the world's oceans" creates a perfect place from which to conduct acts of piracy. Frick also states that pirates are not likely to rule over much land the farther one moves away from the beach and even the smallest portion of a coastal city that tolerates the existence of pirates enables pirates to establish a "toe-hold on land that will spread cancer-like" to the water surrounding it." Once on land and established, pirate havens become a scene of fear and lawlessness controlled by the pirates who inhabit it and "governments are perpetually at odds" on how to rid the pirates from their land bases without the risk of "excessive collateral damage" and loss of innocent lives.

One of the earliest rumored places where pirates – including those plundering the West Indies – collected was on the island of Madagascar, off the East coast of Africa.

Following the first Anglo-Spanish War, early in the 17th century, pirates established a pirate haven at Mehdya, a location with the advantage of being near Spain and major trade routes. The Moroccan sultanate tolerated these pirates due to the wealth they brought to the country. However, during summers, Mehdya became less safe as the calmer waters favored the galleys used to suppress piracy; therefore, the coast of Munster was used as a complementary base for piracy. Mehdya became the main retreat of Atlantic pirates, though the Spanish blockaded Mehdya in 1611, and captured it in 1614.

In the early 17th century in Munster (Ireland's southernmost province), Leamcon (near Schull) was a pirate stronghold, while pirates traded easily in nearby Baltimore and Whiddy Island. Munster's coast provided favorable geography in the form of harbors, bays, islands, anchorages and headlands, while the province's remoteness made it difficult to control from London or Dublin. Literate pirates in Ireland could, till 1613, escape secular trial (making their prosecution much more difficult) by pleading "benefit of clergy".

Pirate demographics

Origins

Geographically, they "left behind little or no property and few documents by their own hands." Most of the pirates were from England, Scotland, Ireland, and Wales. Of that population approximately one-quarter were linked to British port cities like Bristol, Liverpool, and Plymouth. Approximately one-quarter of the populations were associated with men of the West Indies and North America. The others came from other parts of the world such as the Netherlands, France, Portugal, Denmark, Belgium, Sweden, and several parts of Africa.

Seafaring "became one of the most common male occupations" for Africans and African-Americans in the early 19th century. Black sailors filled about one-fifth of the population at various sea havens. Becoming a pirate offered a choice of other occupations for African-Americans that could improve their conditions. "Africans and African Americans both free and enslaved were numerous and active on board pirate vessels." Some chose piracy because the only other option was slavery. Some black pirates were escaped slaves. Boarding a pirate vessel became a way to escape to the Atlantic North undetected. Escaped slave Frederick Douglass disguised himself in "sailor's garb," and "was able to travel undetected to the North and his freedom." As crewmen, blacks made up part of the "pirate vanguard." They also worked the seafaring trades of "ship building, caulking, and sail making."

Class

An important factor of turning to piracy is one's social class. Pirates typically composed themselves from amongst the lowest social classes. They were just men that saw piracy as a lucrative opportunity in which they had little to lose. A simple attraction for the lower social class was money. These "dispossessed proletarians" sought the wealth they needed to live and an escape from the dreadful working conditions they had to endure.

Piracy also represented a counterculture that attracted the working class. Living outside the society that oppressed them, presented an ability to attain liberty at sea. As pirates, men could organize a social world apart from the authoritarian environment that composed of mercantilism and imperial order, and use it to attack that authority's property. Life at sea made available a singular opportunity of freedom that the lower social classes could acquire. Piracy meant to forsake "fundamental social rules, escape conventional authority, manufacture their own power," and accumulate a considerable amount of wealth.

Occupation

The occupational background of the people that turned to piracy "came overwhelmingly from seafaring employments." Pirates customarily had experience in labor as merchant seamen, sailors of the royal navy, privateers, and sometimes as fishermen. It was beneficial to have experience within these occupations because life at sea was hard and dangerous. Seafaring skills would ease the difficulty of pirate life and provided occupational advancement whilst on board.
 
A vast majority of pirates also came from the crews of captured merchant vessels. Frequently, captured merchantmen would volunteer to join the pirate crew. The captors were already "familiar with the single-sex community of work and the rigors of life-and death-at sea."  They saw little difference between merchant and pirate life; understanding that their other option was death, the men usually volunteered to join ranks. This favored the pirates because they preferred volunteers. This preference was reasoned by the fact that they were more likely to create social cohesion amongst the crew.

"Other pirates had been indentured servants, especially the fourteen-year variety." A fourteen-year indenture "meant that they had been transported to the colonies in punishment for crimes committed in England." Transferring from one life of crime for another was painless.

Age

According to Gilje and data collected at the time of the American Revolution, the ages of pirates ranged from fourteen to fifty years old.  More than half of the population were in their twenties. The average age was 25, with less than 20 percent of seamen under twenty years old.  Most of the men within that percentage were eighteen or nineteen. At the time, a ship may contain a boy of ten or twelve, but it was very uncommon. On these occasions, it was the parent or guardian that made the arrangements and would sign the boy away to a ship. Approximately 20 percent of the populations were men in their thirties, forties, and fifties.  This small percentage was a commonality because by the time a man reached his thirties, he likely moved on to a "new occupation ashore, turned to fishing, labored on the docks, or had been lost at sea."

Aside from the criminal world of piracy, there was also the emerging colonies in North America.  While nearly as dangerous and deadly as becoming a pirate, colonialism in the Americas offered those who dared, a chance at changing their socioeconomic place.  In many ways, the freedom of colonialism and piracy are very parallel.  Both are risky and dangerous,  and gave an individual the chance to make many decisions of their own accord.."

Becoming a pirate

Mutiny
Hans Turley argues mutiny was common on long voyages and often discipline was brutal if captains heard discussions of revolt even though these actions were a serious offense due to the "direct assault on the order – thus the status quo – on a seagoing vessel." Turley also argues that the "temptations to turn pirate" centered on the opportunities for employment and profit; and therefore was a result of when the "wars ceased, sailors faced either remaining idle or making smaller wages" or ultimately turn pirate.

Other mutineers were "privateer crews" who became "frustrated by the lack of booty" or even became greedy or were unhappy with their terms. These temptations for mutiny, according to Rediker, grew from an "array of resistances against such concentrated authority" and the sailors developed an understanding of the importance of equality. However, also according to Marcus Rediker, only one third of all mutinies at sea led to piracy.

"Collectivism" and "anti-authoritarianism" was cemented into the mutineers core values and all of these beliefs would influence the decision to turn pirate and how they would conduct themselves thereafter. In contrast to the egalitarian belief towards mutiny, Peter Leeson argues, the "prospect of sufficient gain" may influence a sailor; piracy could pay extremely well sometimes better than privateering. A pirate could enjoy every penny of the ship's "ill-gotten booty." Another argument against the egalitarian idea of mutiny that Leeson suggests is that the pirate was as "self-interested as anyone else" and "given the opportunity" would ultimately "take ten times as many shares" as his fellow pirates if in fact they could get away with it.

Impressment
Impressment refers to the coercion of a sailor into joining a crew, either by a navy or by a rogue crew of pirates. Though prevalent throughout the Royal Navy, was also implemented by Atlantic pirates to maintain a healthy number of crew members. In both instances, the practice brought with it rampant desertion and lowered morale, which was especially true in the case of the British Royal Navy, some of whom even went on to join pirate crews. Pirates, however, were no exception when it came to turnover. According to Denver Brunsman, "the vast majority of impressments in colonial regions involved small numbers of seamen, mostly to replace the diseased, deserted, or deceased." Because of the naturally dangerous life of a pirate (or a common seaman for that matter) impressment was an "evil necessity" of 18th century maritime life, and one that remained a blight on the British Royal Navy until the conclusion of the Napoleonic Wars in 1815.

State sponsored, or military impressment was entirely different in the Atlantic World when compared to impressment in the world of piracy.  According to Paul Gilje, impressment was used by the British government as a way to deny liberty to Britons who called the colonies home.  While the manpower would be welcome on the ship, the more important goal of the British government exerting its power over British subjects living in the colonies was purely for political reasons.

Pirate ships would often impress those who had skills that were deemed to be beneficial for the running of a successful ship.  Although this was not standard policy early on in the Golden Age of Piracy, by the early 1720s pirate ships began to take on more impressed hands because of lack of seamen willing to join of their own volition. When Blackbeard captured the French frigate La Concorde and renamed her the Queen Anne's Revenge he forced the three surgeons on board, carpenters and a cook to remain with his pirate crew.

The rewards of piracy

The obvious answer as to why a sailor would become a pirate is for the potentially enormous monetary gain. These gains were impossible to achieve in the navy or working on merchant ships. While many pirates were caught and punished by the state, untold numbers disappeared, presumably with their newly acquired riches.	

Another reason that piracy may have appealed to some is that the pirate ship freed them from the hierarchical command structure, often enforced with violence, found in the navy and on merchant vessels. Still others may have become pirates to continue living in a homosocial world wherein they could practice their preferred sexuality. Possibly a sailor weighed all of these issues when deciding whether to become a pirate.

Pirate ships

Pirates did not have the luxury of building their ships; they were "acquired". As a result, a pirate captain had to be on the lookout for a vessel that would serve his purpose and procure the ship without harming it in such a way as to make it unfit for service. There is consensus among scholars that pirates would use both small vessels like a sloop or a full-rigged pinnace, as well as the larger slave ships (but not as often), and on rare occasions the warship. Along these lines, the naval historian David Cordingly categorized pirate attacks that had been reported along the North American seabord between 1710–1730 by the numbers of recorded attacks, with an overwhelming 55% involving sloops, 25% in the larger ships, 10% in brigs and brigantines, 5% in schooners, 3% in open sail-less boats, and 2% in snows.

Smaller ships certainly had advantages in the Caribbean and along coastal waterways. They could be careened much easier and faster than the larger vessels, which is a great advantage when a pirate ship could not pull into a dry dock or take long stretches of time to perform maintenance. Small vessels also had shallow drafts and could hide "among sandbanks, creeks, and estuaries" where larger ships could not. The smaller vessels also had a speed advantage over shorter distances than the larger ships of the age. The ratio of displacement to sail capacity was high on small ships, meaning it was easier to bring the boat up to speed fast and produce more speed with less sail. Small vessels made up the bulk of the pirate fleet in the West Indies and the Atlantic for these reasons; among the favored were the single mast sloops and schooners.

For all of the advantages of a small ship, there were drawbacks that could sway captains to look to larger vessels. A sloop or a ship of similar size could not carry a large enough crew to take on bigger prizes by boarding and couldn't carry enough firepower to force submission or fight it out with larger foes; it was also limited in the amount of cargo it could carry. In terms of firepower, anything the size of a sloop would not carry more than fourteen guns, with the French sloop's carrying six guns or less. Conversely some of the largest pirate ships like Bartholomew Roberts flagship the Royal Fortune sported forty-two guns.

Successful pirate crews would capture or buy a small ship to begin with and then "trade up" to larger ones. However changing ships many times was not the norm and most crews would stick with one or two ships. A pirate would make the switch from a small to large vessel for the advantages a small ship could not provide or to replace a ship that was damaged or needed such extensive repairs that could not be done by the crew. When a ship was captured, it had to be converted into a vessel suitable for the pirates needs. This meant knocking down cabin walls and lowering the forecastle to create a flush deck, allowing greater utilization of deck space in engagements and storage of armaments.  Any unnecessary decorations or structures would be stripped off and as many guns as possible were fit. What was left when they were finished was a sleek, armed to the teeth ship with as much thought to speed and efficiency as possible.

It was not easy for pirates to capture a "man-of-war" (see "ship of the line"),  but they would sometimes come across large ships that could be easily converted for use, slave ships; these were full rigged, three mast giants; a slave ship loaded down with human cargo and a small crew was easy prey for pirates who wanted to take her or strip everything of value. An example of this is the pirate capture of the Princes Galley, a slaver heading to the Caribbean. The pirates pursued and caught the galley, firing their guns to slow and stop the slave ship; eventually they pulled up alongside and took the gold, gunpowder, weapons, and slaves and sailed off.

Weaponry

Archaeologists Lawrence E. Babits, Joshua B. Howard and Matthew Brenckle propose that Pirate weaponry might include weapons of several nationalities and sizes and pirates might be presumed to have a variety of weapons, which could have been captured as they upgraded their vessel and personal weapons; pirates also may have "shifted weaponry from one vessel to another" to create a "more powerful armament." For example, Blackbeard's flagship, the Queen Anne's Revenge, was discovered in late 1996. This vessel was originally mastered by Henry Bostock (1717) and captured by Blackbeard on December 5, 1717 and what was found on it was a "smaller two cannon exhibited inscriptions", which revealed that one was manufactured in England" and the other in Sweden. Wayne R. Lusardi argues there is "considerable reasonable doubt" for the ships identification and Blackbeard's flagship, and if it is Queen Anne's Revenge, the "artifact assemblage does not reflect" in any way a "distinctly piratical material culture." Lusardi also states the idea of a pirate leaving small arms and ammunition on a grounded vessel is perplexing, yet "many abandoned items occur in the archaeological record." Since then thirty one cannon have been identified and more than 250,000 artifacts have been recovered. The cannon are of different origins such as; Swedish, English and possibly French, and of different sizes as would be expected with a colonial pirate crew. Pirates also used "bags of shot" or langrage more than men-of-war did because they were made up easily and this was certainly used on the 1717 Whydah, which was a "vessel positively identified as a pirate." There are a few differences in weaponry between pirates and men-of-war but one in particular are hand grenades which were "hollow cannonballs filled with black powder" and "pierced with a circular hole" in which a "bamboo tube was inserted" to serve as a "conduit for the fuse." Grenades were also explained by Johnson as "case bottles fill'd with powder" with "shot, slugs, and pieces of lead or iron" with a quick "match at the end of it" presently ran into the "bottle to the powder." Others argue that any suggested pirate ship or pirate artifact models includes precisely those items that an armed merchantman would have, including a "mix of cannon of different sizes", often from different nations, loaded with "shot designed to damage a vessel's rigging and personnel." Also, personal weaponry such as pistols, cutlasses, and knives would be found on any vessel, which Rediker argues was used to "slit the noses of captives, cut off ears" and used the "knife and gun against their victims."

Terrorism as tactics
The Early Modern World was replete with various methods of coercion and violence that the state would utilize to impose its will on the lower rungs of society.  Not only did they lose the control over their lives, but many were subjected to various methods of torture and capital punishment. The institutionalization of these devices cultivated the notion of terror from above. According to Marcus Rediker "Pirates consciously used terror to accomplish their aims" which varied from physical violence and intimidation to acquiring remunerations.  Pirates primarily sought easy gains that would allow them to acquire booty while avoiding actual conflict.

The most pronounced tool pirates had at their disposal when confronting a potential prize was to employ the Jolly Roger.  This symbol was easily identified and the consequences of resistance were equally as well known. Sailors knew that, if in their attempt to defend their ship they failed, there was a great possibility that they could be tortured.  The renown of pirates was not solely based on or confined to the co-opting of disciplinary tactics commonly used by the men sailing with official commission, but also due to their habit of "destroying massive amounts of property" with impunity.  The desecration of cargo and impairing of ships were standard occurrences in run-ins with pirates.  This is believed to be an "indirect terror" against those the pirates saw as their enemies.

Theft
The pirate's characteristic loot included various ships' cargo like slaves or tobacco. There were also very unconventional trophies, such as the wig of a captured captain that the famed pirate Walter Kennedy once took as booty. The most sought after prize that pirates wanted to capture was, unquestionably, a ship, an ocean vessel that pirates could convert to suit their own needs. Pirates would scrape a captured ship for guns, masts, rope, and other supplies that could repair or improve their current vessel. Whereas capturing a ship that was more equipped and more powerful than their current craft was the ultimate prize, the issue was that "the pirate could only capture a prize which his vessel could catch." A faster, larger ship with quality weaponry indicated that the pirate could capture other treasures more easily.

It was not tricky for pirates to steal "deep-sea sailing ship, especially small, fast, and well-armed craft such as sloops." The most common method of acquiring prizes was capture. Capturing was a way in which a pirate could overcome a ship by boarding, gunnery, and possibly intimidation. Another method within piracy was the "crime of opportunity." Pirates would take their time identifying a target which was easy to capture. The "easy" targets were rare whilst on the high seas. This meant that pirates usually had to lie in wait for the opportunity to capture anything. Due to their opportunistic and sometimes patient methodologies, pirates for the most part were able to "capture their prizes without fighting." Threatening violence was an effective way that pirates were able to plunder ships, and "force disclosure of information about where booty was hidden."

Those in the Atlantic were affected greatly as pirates captured, plundered, and burned "hundreds of merchant ships" with valuable cargo. However, the goal of the pirate was to rob the ship without fighting or blood loss. Pirates faced losses from "resistant victims who hid or destroyed" loot. Because of this, pirates made an effort to "maximize profit" and minimize conflict, which could be detrimental to the pirates, the profits, and the ship. Though pirates wanted to avoid fighting, they still had to overcome the lost potential of hidden loot. Two examples of loss could come when a captured ship's crew "destroyed booty to prevent pirates from taking it" or when a crew would hide "valuables to keep them out pirate hands." Pirate theft was not only to gain money; papers with information like the route of government authorities or the location of another vessel with a larger booty were also important. Once an item was found, a question of its worth and how to distribute it came next. If an object was "indivisible," then the pirates would sell the object or auction it off, and the profits would then be divided.

Like most people, pirates "were creatures of incentives." Piracy allowed a crew to benefit from "every penny of its ship's ill-gotten booty." One's share of the plunder was directly proportionate to a crewman's job aboard the ship, and was outlined in the ship's articles. If a pirate were to take more than his share, hide in times of war, or was dishonest with the crew, he "risked being deposited" somewhere unpleasant and full of hardships. Also, ships were not the only things that were able to be plundered. A select group of pirates also attacked a Sierra Leone fort and several fortresses used for the slave trade.

The life of a pirate

Governance and shipboard relations
Pirates were outlaw sailors, but that doesn't mean they didn't have their own form of government aboard their ships.  The wooden world of piracy was very much structured when it came to shipboard relations.  Suffice to say, this structure did not mimic the oppression of a naval ship sailing under the king's crown, "They wanted leadership by example, not leadership by ascribed status and hierarchy." Before each voyage, or upon the election of a new captain, compacts were drawn up to which guidelines the ship would function. Under these agreements were allocations of authority, distribution of plunder and rations, as well as discipline enforcement.

Rank
Ranks that were found on ordinary vessels of the seventeenth, and eighteenth century were found on pirate ships. They were a necessary part of working together efficiently to survive the perils of the seas.
Failure of captains and other officers to condescend to seamen could result in the desire for the crew to mutiny, thus challenging the officers' right to deference. The late 18th century's challenges to monarchical and aristocratic power structures bled over into shipboard life.

Pirates were mostly former merchant seamen, or at least men who had sailed on vessels legitimately before turning to piracy. As a result, a pirate ship still had the usual terminology found on merchant ships, but the role each ranking sailor would play on the pirate ship was not the norm. A pirate ship still had a Captain of the vessel. As the economist Peter Leeson argues, pirate captains were democratically elected by the entire crew. This was not a lifelong title and had less power than the merchant captain, as Leeson provides evidence of pirate captains being removed from the position, in one case thirteen captains were removed during one voyage, for not performing at the level that was expected of them or for overstepping their bounds of authority. The Pirate captain had absolute command when pursuing a vessel or in military engagements, otherwise he was another member of the crew.

To check the power of the captain even further, the crew would elect a quartermaster to make sure the men received the necessary rations and equal distribution of the booty. He would also "adjudicate crew member conflicts," and "administer punishment." This was usually an experienced seaman who the crew trusted and knew well. Leeson further states that a pirate captain could not take any action without the support of the quartermaster. One such was Hendrick van der Heul who sailed with William Kidd. He had the fortune to have never been convicted of Piracy and lived a full life beyond his days on the Adventure Prize.

Other ranks include the boatswain, master, gunner, doctor, and carpenter. The regular crewmen held the most power on the pirate ship in the council, from which all important decisions were made, and every pirate was given a vote. Surgeons on some pirate vessels, because of their higher status in regular society and special training, were not allowed to vote when the council took to the ballot box.

Discipline
Shipboard discipline aboard merchant and naval vessels was notoriously harsh, and, more often than not, violent. Pirates, having suffered under these measures, used a more democratic process when determining how aberrant sailors would be punished, and there were fewer transgressions that were considered punishable. These punishments were still often violent, which was the norm in the early 18th century.

Community
A part of becoming a pirate was to meet the expectation of uprooting their living environment and spending most of their time out at sea. The men were required to live in cramped, claustrophobic quarters within close proximity of others. The discomfort could have created a more hostile environment, but it did not. While on the ship the pirates "maintained a multicultural, multiracial, and multinational social order." This new social order established a profound sense of community amongst the men. They consistently showed solidarity for each other and developed strong feelings of group loyalty. The communities of pirates were willing to join forces "at sea and in port, even when the various crews were strangers to each other." The positive communal atmosphere aboard ship created a home-like situation where there were limited social and physical boundaries within the group.

Clothing

No standard issue uniforms for anyone on board a vessel were issued prior to 1748 in the British Royal Navy. Clothing was somewhat standardized by 1623 when it was made possible for sailors to purchase clothing at fixed prices from the Navy Commissioners. The selection was not extensive; items included: Monmouth capps, Red Caps, Yarne Stockings, Irish Stockings, Blew Shirts, White Shirts, Cotton Waistcoats, Cotton Drawers, Neats Leather Shoes, Blew Neck Clothes, Canvas Suites, Ruggs of one breadth, and Blew Suites. Until 1664, sailors that were pressed into the Navy were not given any clothing, forced to use what clothes they had on their backs until accumulating several months of pay when they could then buy clothing.

Pirates of the early eighteenth century and prior wore much the same clothing as any sailors. Clothing, like any useful tangible good, when captured as booty, would be distributed out. Calico Jack Rackham was known for his "flamboyant dress." Sir Richard Hawkins, the famous Elizabethan privateer advocated wearing armor in battle while at sea. Records indicate that there were not nearly enough pieces of armor for all to wear, so it likely was for his officers and himself.  Woolen clothing was worn in more extreme latitudes.

Like in the stories of Anne Bonny and Mary Read, women, often when on a vessel would don men's clothing. This was immortalized in an English folk song, "My yellow locks I will cut off, men's clothing will put on, And I will go along with you and be your waiting-man."

Pirate speech
As academics like Peter Leeson and Marcus Rediker argue, a pirate was more often than not someone from a previous seagoing occupation. They were merchant seamen, sailors in the royal navy, and privateers, all of whom would form into a pirate crew. They were not upper class, but the "dregs of society." George Choundas argues in his book Pirate Primer that there was in fact a pirate language, but it was simply accents and the way of speech to which men of the seas were accustomed. They came from different ethnic backgrounds or political units, so pirate speech was simply the way these men could communicate; and what they all knew was the language of the seas. It was the nautical speech of the seventeenth, eighteenth, and nineteenth centuries.

Food and alcohol

Pirates of the Atlantic ate much of the same foods as their mainstream mariner cohorts. Often they would get more of it, but ideally, they would get far greater quality food. Mariners in the merchant and naval service were often given meager amounts of low quality sustenance. During a typical week five non-pirate sailors might share four or five pounds (pre-salted weight) of beef, and five pounds of bread. Scarcity of food might be the main reason some sailors turned to pirating, like pirate John Phillips who "ranted and raved" about the merchant John Wingfield, claiming that he starved his men. The primary difference between legal mariners and their unlawful counterparts is that they hoped to find an abundant supply of food with the capturing of vessels.

A defining difference in the food system on a pirate vessel is that they did not have to compete with officers like sailors in the navy or merchant services.

Food and alcohol were treated similarly to each other, split equally. The necessaries of life were distributed equally, unlike booty, which was usually given in higher proportions to officers, as directed in their articles. Bread, butter, cheese, and meat were items that were considered luxuries by many low level mariners, but items that a pirate would look forward to as often as possible. There is evidence pirates specifically hoped to find edibles in their loot over specie. One pirate, Joseph Mansfield, claimed that the "love of drink" were greater motives than gold. This policy of strict equality does not seem to be applicable to earlier privateers, as Kris Lane points out in Pillaging The Empire: Piracy in the Americas, 1500-1750. Dutch Sea Rover of the seventeenth century, Joris Van Speilbergen and the expeditions leaders dined on "Beef, pork, fowl, citrus, fruits, preserves, olives, capers, wines, and beer," while the common crew of that voyage "scrounged herbs" with mussels and berries."

Captain George Lowthar used deception, pretending to be a friendly merchantman, came aboard a fellow merchant ship to extend customary greetings. There, Lowthar's crew secretly inspected the cargo and found items of interest. Once making their intentions known to the boarded crew, they ended up taking thirty casks of brandy and five hogshead of wine, among other goods.  Lowthar's crew had only decided to seize the ship once they decided it was worth taking.

Sailors might hope to supplement their meager diets with fish if they were lucky enough to catch them. The islands frequented were plentiful with potential foods, such as turtle, seafowl, shellfish, and fish. Sea turtle was considered some of the best meat possible. While at sea, when supplies were low, fresh fish such like snapper, shark, catfish, grouper, albacore were caught and often barbecued, though one would have to be certain not to let the deck on fire. When food was scarce, a rationing system may be put in place similar to legal sailors. In some cases, the only items there were requested of the looted victim from pirates was food and drink. When gold or silver was found, food was a popular item to barter for when bartering was easier than fighting.

Water was essential, but difficult to keep usable for very long. Alcohol, like beer and especially wines would keep much longer. Like food, pirate crews were given equal title to captured strong liquors. Alcohol, notoriously, was spent quicker than on other, more traditional marine vessels. Ironically, slaver turned pirate Bartholomew Roberts was a "sober man" and would not allow his own crew to drink on board the ship. 
 
Woodes Rogers, privateer turned pirate hunter noted a drink called "flip". Flip consisted of rum, beer, and sugar, served warm, often in a tin can. Another popular drink was punch. Different versions were made depending on what ingredients were available. One rum version was called "bumboe." Captain George Shelvocke enjoyed "hipsey," a concoction of brandy, wine, and water.

Andrew Brown's sermon during the late 18th century focused on the perils of "the seafaring life." Focusing on the overindulgence of alcohol, he preached that drinking had become habit for pirates. He continued that overindulgence had "long been regarded as one of the distinguishing characteristics of seafaring life."B. R. Burg writes extensively about the debauchery and riotous behavior of pirates when they got a hold of quantities of alcohol. There are numerous cases where pirates were too drunk to capture ships, defend their own ships, negotiate for prisoner exchanges, control crews & preventing mutinies and sometimes even to just navigate, in one case ending up with 118 men of a 200-person crew perishing because of a shipwreck. Blackbeard, after a "prolonged drinking bout" and while "uproariously laughing" shot his mate, Israel Hand's knee, "laming him for life."

Illness, disease, and health
Sickness and diseases such as, dysentery, malaria, smallpox, and yellow fevercreated problems among ships and "could be fatal." Pirates, like privateers, were a little better off than those who worked on merchant or naval ships as "food was superior," "pay was higher,"  "shifts were shorter," and the crew's powers of "decision making was greater." Epidemics and scurvy led some to desert "naval vessels for pirates." In the event of disabilities occurring while in service to the ship, some pirates set up a "common wealth" plan to be paid to any man in the event of injury. Medical artifacts recovered from the wreck site of Blackbeard's Queen Anne Revenge include; a urethral syringe used to treat syphilis, pump clysters to pump fluid into the rectum, a porringer which may have been used in bloodletting treatments, and a cast brass mortar and pestle used in preparing medicine.

Doctors and surgeons
There were doctors and surgeons present on some pirate vessels. Any surgeon or doctor who sailed with pirates, according to Rediker, was considered by their peers "to be insane." Surgeons/doctors were paid more shares, between "one and a quarter" and "one and a half," than other men on pirate ships. However, doctors and surgeons weren't always trusted as they were not allowed to vote with the crew "because their class background (or forced status)."

Women on ships
Superstitions surrounding women on ships were rampant. Being on board a pirate ship demanded "physical strength and stamina". Few women were seen as able to do the work to the standard. It was widely believed aboard ships that women were detrimental to both work and social order. Women were "objects of fantasy", yet they were also seen as cause of poor circumstances, disagreement, and "potential breaches in the male order of seagoing solidarity".

A rare occurrence in which a woman was persuaded to board a pirate ship comes from the story of Captain Eric Cobham and a prostitute named Maria.  Even though the ship's articles stated boys and women were not permitted on the ship, Cobham faced no repercussions from the crew when he brought her aboard.  While on the ship, Maria proved that she was "as callous as the worst of them".  Maria's actions made Cobham "more nervous than ever," so much so that she effectively scared him from pirating. 

Anne Bonny, after meeting "Calico Jack" Rackham, came aboard his ship and gave him the necessary votes he needed to be elected captain. Anne was then elected "second-in-command", but she became the true leader of the ship and even took the captain's residence away from Calico. As a leader, Anne designed her attacks with "cunning and fantasy" which allowed her to escape unharmed from possible battles through duplicity and "a good measure of theater."

Mary Read was less rash and spontaneous than her counterpart, Bonny. Read was also admired for "her virtue and sense of justice". Both Read and Bonny dressed as women aboard the ship but would change into trousers for battle. These women were accepted by the crew due to their management ability, navigational skills, and by their continued perseverance to outperform the rest of the crew. Bonny and Read were independently established as fierce, swashbuckling women, and were defined as genuine pirates in every sense.

Pirates and sex
Carolyn Eastman finds that pirates were represented as hypermasculine characters from the 18th century forward, and she notes that they were depicted as sexual transgressors. She argues that this imagery of piracy appealed to elite men, who enjoyed the thought of an alternate masculinity without the restraint required of men in the upper classes.

"Enemies of all mankind"

Hosti Humani Generis
The scourge of the high seas pirates were cast as "hostis humani generis", a term which was derived from Roman law. This title was rendered onto them in part by Sir Edward Coke in his effort to renovate existing legislation which dealt with piracy. As a consequence of this label, a British Admiralty Judge by the name of Sir Charles Hedges would issue a sweeping proclamation which would grant the power of "jurisdiction over all people – anywhere on earth – who interfered with British commerce." The last great epoch of piracy gave rise to individuals who as a cohort were defined by, "their almost universal rejection of national and religious authorities."

In the book Rum, Sodomy, and the Lash, Hans Turley delves into the implications of the multidimensional threat pirates posed to the social and economic establishment within British realm.  Turley states that there was an argument to be made in which pirates were perceived to "belong to no class at all" and that they had "turned their backs to normative society."  Furthermore, to solidify the rendering of the term hostis humani generis to pirates, Turley connects the economic and legal implications stating that pirates were "criminal merchants" who were "opposed to law-abiding seafaring merchants."

Cotton Mather
Cotton Mather, a Puritan minister wrote that the coast had been plagued by pirates and his congregation wished they could be rid of this nuisance.  Mather believed that his prayers were answered when six pirates were captured and taken prisoner. Before their execution took place, he both "bestowed the best instructions" he could and prayed with them. After preaching to the pirates Mather, wanted them to "provide examples and warnings" to the crowd awaiting the executions to "affirm the values of Christianity."

Ministers advocated that children should be "protected" from this rebellious lifestyle and should be "kept from going to sea." Many ministers felt that pursuing religion while at sea would be "impossible to sustain as long as sailors took the name of the Lord in vain." Minister John Flavel also made the point that the sea was a place "with strange creatures" where sins proliferated and "death was omnipresent." Flavel continued that seamen were "to be numbered neither with the living nor the dead, their lives hanging continually in suspense before them."

Life at sea was tough, which could cause men to feel their "own insignificance and dependence upon the almighty God." There were even societies and organizations that promoted religion to sailors along the waterfronts, such as "The Marine Bible Society of New York, the Seamen in the Port of New York (SPGAS), and the American Seamen's Friend Society (ASFS).

Pirates were viewed as godless individuals, and yet "the closest thing to" a "pirate constitution" was New England "puritan church ‘covenants,'" just without the acceptance of the divine. "God-fearing people" claimed that pirates were "devils" "bound for hell." Some pirates, such as Blackbeard, embraced this belief by inverting "the values of Christianity," casting themselves in a way that "society understood to be evil," and even to the embrace of Lucifer.

Legal system
Prior to the mid-17th century, how Atlantic pirates were treated under the law broadly adhered to a 1559 treaty between France and Spain which laid out the “no peace beyond the line” rule, meaning that hostilities in New World waters (anything west of the Azores) was not governed by European norms. As Spain gradually lost hegemony in the Atlantic, however, this policy fell out of use, and British laws became increasingly important in the legal world of piracy.

The early 17th century saw a more coherent legal view of piracy begin to take shape, with the work Mare Liberum (Free Sea) by Dutch jurist and polymath Hugo Grotius attempting to draw a legal distinction between “privateers” with letters of marque from “pirates.” Grotius also attempted to brand Spain and Portugal’s dominance of the sea as a form of piracy in itself, as it attempted to “blockade the seas.”

The late 17th century, when the “Golden Age of Piracy” was getting underway, saw a major shift in British policy, accompanying their rise as a maritime power. However, Britain itself had multiple competing legal systems which could claim jurisdiction over piracy. 
The legal system of the English during the late seventeenth century was built upon common law (28 Henry VIII, c. 15). This allowed circumstantial evidence to be admissible, but also forced the captured to be transferred to England where the law was enforceable. This made it burdensome for the colonial governments to enforce extradition. Additionally, Common law’s emphasis on local courts, the right to a jury of peers, and different treatment of Englishmen and foreigners clashed with the international nature of piracy; foreign pirates preyed on British ships and vice versa, and piracy often took place in waters outside British dominion, although the nationality of those involved might be British. Complicating matters was the British crown’s insistence on judging any piracy case which involved a British subject in any way. The inadequacies of common law led to the adoption of the Admiralty Law system, a system originating in the Middle Ages, to govern cases of piracy.

During the seventeenth century, after Jamaica had become a haven for pirates. Henry Morgan was selected as deputy governor. During this period, there was debate among English scholars about the extent of jurisdiction of the 1536 acts. Jamaica had one of the first laws to deliver justice with royal legitimacy. It became known as "The Jamaica Act." 1683 would mark the beginning of aggressive anti-piracy laws. The increasingly anti-piratical policy by the Jamaican government started an exodus from Jamaica.  This law was the only one of its kind in the Caribbean or North American colonies and it simply forced the buccaneers and pirates out, into the Carolinas, New York, and the Bahamas.

Bradley Nutting makes the argument that it was the early Golden Age pirates attack's on several Muslim pilgrim ships in 1695 that was initially responsible for the flood of legislation in the early eighteenth century.  Following Henry Avery's capture of the mogul ship quote, the East India Company petitioned the Privy Council in 1696 to issue a proclamation of arrest. A reward of fifty pounds was offered for Avery's crew, while five-hundred pounds was offered for Avery himself. Those incidences led to two major acts of Parliament which reshaped British policy towards piracy both in Britain itself and in the colonies.

The 1696 Act for Preventing Frauds moved responsibility for prosecuting piracy from central British authorities to colonial governments, establishing colonial vice-admiralty courts to create uniformity.  Prior to this act, there was considerable variance in the existence and enforcement of anti-piracy laws between Britain and her colonies, and between the colonies themselves. The 1698 Act for the More Effectual Suppression of Piracy made all acts of piracy "triable" either at sea or in the newly created colonial admiralty courts, suspended the right to a jury trial for those accused of piracy, and encouraged British colonies to double down against piracy.

The Piracy Act of 1700. The legislation took two years to pass after repeated pressures from the East India Company and the Board of Trade. There was now authorization to set up vice-admiralty courts throughout the colonies with legal authority to carry out sentencing. The first notable pirate to be brought to trial with this new set of laws was Captain Kidd. Kidd was denied an adequate defense, as well as the ability to review documents he claimed would exonerate him. Ironically, he was acquitted of piracy, but convicted of murder. Regardless, he was executed and his body was hung in chains over the River Thames for years.

After the end of the War of Spanish Succession (1702–1713) and the Peace of Ultrecht legal privateers working for a legitimately recognized government simple turned to piracy. As many politicians feared, the privateering strategy of war backfired. Corruption of local officials was also a problem for authorities. Edward Teach (Blackbeard) bribed the colonial governor of North Carolina to avoid prosecution.

An increased effort to combat piracy with naval forces, effectively stamped out piracy. This combination of laws and naval efforts was responsible for thousands of deaths of pirates and alleged pirates. In a time when royal mercy and pardons in England routinely commuted death penalties to lesser sentences, especially one or another form of bound labor (after the Transportation Act of 1718), pirates rarely had their sentences lessened and instead were hanged in huge numbers and high percentages.

Pirates on trial 
Pirates themselves often considered the court trial which awaited many of them to be little more than shams. On at least one occasion, the pirates of Antis' crew staged a comedic mock trial which satirized the legal system as unjust and bloodthirsty, stacked against them. However, in many cases suspects accused of piracy could call favorable witnesses, challenge jury selection and produce documents in their favor. In some cases, notably the trial of Capt. William Kidd, the suspect was even granted professional legal counsel.  Even after the Act for the More Effectual Suppression of Piracy abolished the necessity of a jury in piracy trials, trials often were decided by juries rather than judges. At the same time, judges in piracy trials interfered to tip the scales against a suspected pirate, helping ensure their execution by hanging.  Despite this, however, pirate trials were not entirely one-sided, and pirates on multiple occasions secured non-guilty verdicts in courts.

List of pirate trials 
Four examples of Pirate Trials range from 1676 to 1861.

 Trial of George Cusack and Crew (1676)
 Trial of Crompton Guyther and Crew (1680)
 Trial of Capt. William Kidd (1701)
 Trial of the Privateer Savannah on Charge of Piracy (1861)

Naval enforcement
It was not until the signing of the Treaty of Utrecht was signed in 1713 settling the war with France that Britain could make a serious attempt to deploy its navy against piracy. By 1718 the Royal Navy was refit for action against the pirates and with third, fourth, and fifth-rate warships armed with some seventy plus guns, it was more firepower than any pirate ship of the time could have withstood. As David Cordingly argues, the pirates were "no match for naval squadrons of this strength," and that the only reason piracy had been so successful was because the British government had not put this level of effort into hunting pirates before.

Two well known naval actions against pirates are the successful destructions of Edward Teach, or Blackbeard, and Bartholomew Roberts. In 1718, off the coast of North Carolina at the Ocracoke Inlet, Teach's ship was at anchor and surprised by Lieutenant Maynard of the Royal Navy. Maynard and Teach engaged each other with small arms and cannon until the ships were close enough to board; Maynard boarded the pirate ship to fight Teach, and the notorious pirate eventually fell. Blackbeard's death became the stuff of legend and was used by the Royal Navy in its propaganda campaign in eliminating piracy.

In 1721 the infamous pirate Captain Roberts was cornered off the coast of Africa by a Captain Ogle in HMS Swallow, a powerful fifty-gun warship. Roberts was converting a group of French ships that he had captured for his own use when Swallow sailed up to engage. Roberts would fight Ogle despite being outmanned and outgunned; he fell during the battle. With arguably the most famous pirates of the time gone, and the American coast and Caribbean swarming with the Royal Navy and privateers hired by governors of the American colonies, piracy was systematically hunted to near extinction.

The punishment for piracy

In the Atlantic world of the 17th and 18th centuries piracy was defined as any criminal act committed on the high seas.  This means that many of those accused of piracy were criminals but not necessarily a crew of sailors capturing ships. William Wood who was convicted and hanged for taking his captains money after he and another sailor got in an argument with him and threw him overboard.

Johnson published the statute relating to piracy in the early 18th century in A General History of the Pyrates. The crime was differentiated from wartime privateering in the statute, and defined who was punishable in very specific terms. The prescribed punishment, if convicted, was "Death without Benefit of Clergy, and forfeit Land and Goods." The statute was applicable to the American colonies, but Scotland was excluded. A death sentence could be carried out on captured pirates at sea without benefit of trial, according to the statute. Often clergy were called in to advise the prisoner in the time before his death, or someone else fulfilled this role.

Throughout his text, Johnson describes the punishments meted out on captured pirates. Public execution by hanging was typical, although some were given lesser sentences such as indentures if the court was unconvinced of their complicity with the pirate mission, or if there were other extenuating circumstances. Bodies were also sometimes displayed after the execution. Executions in the early 18th century were somewhat common throughout the Atlantic world, and there were hundreds of crimes that could lead to execution.

The Admiralty Courts and men like Cotton Mather would eventually wrest power from the rogue elements. With gruesome public acts taking place for all to see, pirates would be killed and displayed en masse at many of the ports they once looted or called home in the New World.

Ghost ships

The term "ghost ship" is a long-standing seafaring term for "any vessel found sailing without her crew." Supernatural powers are bound to surface in any discussion of ghost ships. One well-known ghost ship is the Flying Dutchman that is said to be continuously exploring for "safe harbor" and is condemned to eternally "haunt the cape."

It was not unusual for a crew to abandon their ship in times of "sinking," by use of lifeboats or acquiring another vessel. Occasionally whole crews might have been "swept overboard" in rough weather, but the vessel would be destroyed enough to explain the crew's fate. Even less frequently, ships could be overtaken by pirates or from a mutiny within the crew. During this time, the crew would be "abducted and forced" to man other vessels.

In 1735, the ship Baltimore was found anchored in Chebogue, Nova Scotia. The people of the town speculated about the "supernatural powers" that guided the vacant ship.  After an investigation aboard the ship occurred, the men noticed the deck "was awash with blood." Once inside, the men found a woman who described how "local Indians" murdered the crew. After this, the ship was abandoned as not a single person "wanted to buy it, sail it, or even go aboard." Some time passed before the locals learned the crew was actually murdered by the prisoners being carried in the vessel, and the woman was one of ten inmates who had survived. An unknown ghost ship was seen in 1785; the vessel had "no sails" and "no crew" with "fifteen Africans on board." Based upon their desolate condition, it was deemed their time on board the ship had been lengthy. A "shipboard rebellion" might have occurred in which the crew had perished along with some Africans. In this scenario, it is possible that none of the survivors understood "how to sail the vessel and they slowly starved to death". In the twentieth century, the ship Carroll A. Deering was found in the Atlantic with no crew aboard.  The lifeboats were missing and the theories surrounding the ship included "piracy, mutiny, and insurance fraud."

The most notorious of all ghost ships is the Mary Celeste – it has been called "the greatest maritime mystery of all time." The ship was found wet after a storm by the crew of Dei Gratia, because the ship was opened to air out. One theory surrounding the vessel is that the crew needed to air out the ship from chemical fumes from the alcohol. The crew had left everything because they "expected to come back" to the vessel after the fumes had cleared. They got off the ship temporally and waited for the ship to air out in their "small yawl," but the weather changed before they were able to get back to the vessel. The crew of eight men, a mother and child "watched, helplessly" as the ghost ship sailed away without her crew.

Attitude toward death
On every voyage a sailor would face the risk of falling overboard and drowning, starvation, disease, abuse, accidents in the rigging, and attack. Once a sailor abandoned his law-abiding career to become a pirate he knowingly increased his chance of expediting his own death exponentially. Once convicted as a pirate, a sailor faced an almost certain demise of being hanged at the execution docks.

When on trial in Charleston, the pirate Job Bayley was asked why he had attacked several warships that were sent to capture him, he answered that "We thought it had been a pirate."  At yet another trial in London the pirate John Bayley comically played dumb when the Judge asked what he would have done if the warship that apprehended him was nothing more than a merchant ship answering, "I don't know what I would have done." Both men knew that their fate was sealed the moment they were apprehended and both in turn hanged at the gallows.

The story of pirate William Fly, who was executed on July 12, 1726 in Boston, illustrates how arrogantly many pirates viewed death.  He showed no anxiety over his imminent demise, but rather tied his own noose and lectured the hangman about the proper way to tie the knot. Right before he swung off to his death he delivered a warning to all ships captains and owners that in order to prevent their crews from mutinying and resorting to piracy, they would be wise to pay their crews on time and treat them humanly.
 
Some pirates preferred to control their own fate. Pairs of pirates would at times make oaths to one another that in order to insure that neither were captured they would shoot each other. The crew of Bartholomew Roberts preferred not to be taken alive and swore to blow themselves up rather than give the authorities the satisfaction of seeing them hanged. When Roberts and his men were finally found an attempt was made to blow the ship up rather than face capture, however it proved in vain due to an insufficient gunpowder.  Edward Teach's (Blackbeard's) crew also failed to detonate their sloop when facing capture however, the pirate Joseph Cooper and his crew successfully blew themselves up and evaded capture by the authorities.

During the 17th and 18th centuries execution in the British realm was commonplace and a part of life. During the 17th century alone around 800 people were hanged each year in the British Empire.  For a pirate however the odds of finding yourself on the gallows were much higher. In just the ten-year span between 1716 and 1726 at least 418 pirates, and possibly as much as half again more, were hanged. In this world a pirate could be nearly certain that if caught he would end up with a short drop and sudden stop with a noose cinched around his neck.

The gallows were an icon of the 17th and 18th century and could be readily found throughout the Atlantic world. The gallows were particular visible in port cities that routinely featured an execution dock such as "Hope Point" the famous execution dock on the river Thames in Wapping, England. For many pirates this would be the place that their career was put to an end. For some, however, their body would serve one more function, as a reminder. Hundreds of pirates were hanged and their bodies left to dangle in port cities around the world as a reminder that the maritime state would not tolerate a challenge from below. Examples of this barbarous practice can be seen throughout pirate history, including those of William Fly, whose body was hung in chains at the entrance of Boston Harbor to rot, and Calico Jack, whose body was hung at the mouth of the harbor of Port Royal, Jamaica.

Implications

Trials
Rather than civil courts, pirate trials were overseen by the Court of Admiralty. The Court of Admiralty "held mass trials" with "large numbers of pirates at one time" as demonstrations to those interested in taking on a pirate's life. The trial transcripts were frequently published and confessions by those who were to be executed were "very popular." The publication of the trials was intended "to inform, enlighten, and entertain the reading public" as well as "make a profit for the book sellers." Reprints of trials were a common occurrence in order to gain political strength. Though the trials took place in English, they were transcribed in Latin as a way to further remove the public from the transcription's truth and to use it as propaganda. Much of these pamphlets felt repetitive in nature as many of the statements and arguments were the same, just with different names. Trials were also a place of humor, as Job Bayley, who was facing execution for being a pirate, stated that he had not stopped for the government vessels because he had feared the ships were pirates.

Usually, the trials took place in England, due to the fact that the "Admiralty feared that officials in the far-flung outposts of the empire could be bribed." However, an issue with holding trials in England was that the pirates would have to be transported "across vast distances." The law regarding piracy trials was changed at the beginning of the eighteenth century, granting more relaxed rules and allowing for trials to take place in British colonies, so long as a Court of Admiralty was available. Pirates faced greater danger of being executed when the law changed, as it stated if a pirate was taken at sea, an official trial was not necessary, but the end result of execution was to be the same. An act in 1700 allowed for the expansion of the definition of piracy to include not just those "who committed robbery by sea," but also the "mutineer who ran away with the ship" as well as the "sailor who interfered with the defense of his vessel" under a pirate siege. In both 1717 and 1718, pardons were granted in order to "rid the sea of robbers." For example, Israel Hands, Blackbeard's henchman, was taken with fifteen other pirates to Williamsburg, Virginia to stand trial. In exchange for a pardon, Hands testified against corrupt North Carolina officials with whom Teach had consorted. Many stipulations came with these pardons, as they were only granted in certain instances and few surrendered. The few who "accepted the amnesty" would eventually return to their pirate ways. Death was also promised to those found helping pirates, as well as "loss of wages" and "six months' imprisonment to those who refused to defend their ship." Instead of having black pirates stand trial, colonial officials would profit "by selling them into slavery rather than hanging them."

Trials for women pirates were not uniform in sentencing and punishment. Mary Harvey, whose alias was Martha Farlee, was sentenced in North Carolina in the year 1726. Both Mary and her husband Thomas had joined a pirate gang, and shortly thereafter Mary was captured.  Since North Carolina lacked the infrastructure to try pirates, Mary and three others were sent to Williamsburg. Mary "was acquitted and given money to return home" as the court deemed she had been coerced into joining the pirate gang.  Two of the other captives were not as lucky, and were "condemned to die." The third captive was pardoned. Three years later, another female pirate, Mary Crickett, along with five others, was ordered to be executed. When Mary Read and Anne Bonny were captured, they faced execution. However, once their pregnancies were known, they were pardoned from the gallows. Both women were sentenced to prison, where Mary Read eventually perished and Anne Bonny later escaped.

Pirates in memory

A General History of the Pyrates

In 1724, the first edition of A General History of Robberies and Murders of the Most Notorious Pirates was published. The author was listed as a Captain Charles Johnson, whose real name is unknown. However, what is most important about this work is not who penned it, but that it represents what people thought about pirates in the early eighteenth century. A General History of the Pyrates set the tone for every work on pirates that has been written since.

Pirates as the anti-Hero
Pirates were not members of society; they were outside the social norms that would allow Buccaneers and Privateers to remain within the infrastructure of a society. The key reason they cannot be grouped with any social order is because they embraced terror, and particularly as Marcus Rediker phrased it, "a terror of the strong against the weak." The historian Hans Turley used the phrase "Hostis Humani Generis," translated as the enemy of all mankind, to provide an image of pirates. Pirates have thus become the "antiheroes" of history, and this they did so consciously. Eventually the governments of the known world would make villains of these sea raiders calling them "blood lusting monsters," whose sole purpose was "destroying the social order."

The pirate would attack every element of the modern society to form his own identity. They would attack merchant shipping from any nation, plundering the wealth of the ship, and most of the time sinking or burning a great number who fell into their hands. Revenge was sought against merchant captains and officers who were known to have been cruel or unreasonable in the treatment of their crew, often through torture and slow death.  Not to limit themselves on the amount of wealth available to them, a few pirates would even attack slave ships and slave fortresses on the African coast to take slaves (though generally speaking, pirates would free slaves they encountered), for whom they knew some governments would pay for in gold coin; most notably the Portuguese.

Hans Turley looks to the literary evidence of Pirates, and in particular Captain Avery, when drawing the conclusion of the pirate as the "antihero."  Avery's story became the stuff of legend to the masses, and the "fictional exaggeration" of Avery cemented in the minds of the readers the image of a brute bent on theft, ransom, and power.  Turley assures us that the stories were lifted beyond the realm of reality but it is impossible to know for sure who the real Captain Avery was, and it was legitimate to believe the stories due to the lack of any evidence to the contrary.

An attack on commerce and shipping meant an attack on the governments to who these ships belonged. Governments would stop turning a blind eye to these bandits when the costs of ignoring them outweighed attacking the pirate, and so a "campaign to cleanse the seas," was put into effect by governments, lawyers, businessmen, writers, and other members of legitimate society.

Marcus Rediker argues that religion was another point of contention for the pirate, who saw the church as a piece of the system he wanted to escape.  The Pirate was seen as existing in sin by those who lived in normal social constructs, and he relished the separation, likening himself to hellish images and Satan.  As an example Blackbeard and his use of smoke, fire, and ash bellowing from his large bead to give the impression of a demon from hell itself, as Johnson describes him. Pirates would mock and ridicule men of the cloth who they came in contact with, and did not observe Christian holidays.

With their attacks on private property, belief systems, and governments pirates became outcasts to the realm of the unknown and dangerous.  This realm, the sea as Rediker suggests, aided in the view of the pirate as a danger, a threat of invasion, and uncontrollable entity; just as the sea was to those who both knew the sea and had only heard tales.  It was the sea that was separated from authority, and thus was the pirate who could attack those who entered the oceans.

Sources of information about Pirates
Scholars consider many sources of information during their research. Primary sources are documents and records that are original to the time that is being studied. Secondary sources are written later, and can include commentary on and interpretation of primary sources.  Firsthand information about piracy is relatively rare, and scholars often pull from the same texts when compiling their data.  During the late seventeenth and early eighteenth centuries, narratives of sea captains and pirate adventures took many forms.
 Books:  Piracy inspired many books during the Golden Age.  Books like The Buccaneers of America by Alexandre Exquemelin, first published in 1678, and A General History of the Pyrates by a Captain Charles Johnson, published in 1724, were extremely popular, often earning many editions and reprints.  These stories provided insight into a mysterious subculture in the Atlantic World while shedding light on how the public often viewed piracy.
 Trial Records:  When pirates were put on trial in Admiralty or Vice Admiralty courts, unofficial records of the proceedings were frequently published in pamphlet form.  Official records were also kept and can be accessed by scholars today, but the pamphlets were created to be sold and the accounts were easily sensationalized to attract buyers.  These records of the trials showed the public examples of the law and its triumphs over the crimes of piracy.  The pirates themselves were often secondary characters in these narratives.
 Religious Sermons:  Messages by ministers like Cotton Mather warning against piracy were intended to scare the public into social submission.  These sermons would emphasize the crimes of accused men and show piracy to be the "antithesis" of the desired Christian way of life.  Ministers detailed the sins of piracy and called for repentance in their execution sermons, using fear of damnation to further chastise onlookers and exhort clean living.
 Newspapers and Periodicals:  Newspapers also published information regarding pirates, their captures, and their trials, as they did other news of the day.
 Archaeology is increasingly providing another perspective on piracy. Pirate shipwrecks such as Queen Anne's Revenge (used by Blackbeard), Whydah Gally (used by Sam Bellamy), and Quedagh Merchant (used by William Kidd) have been excavated. Pirate land bases such as the underwater section of Port Royal, Jamaica; the Spanish part of St Augustine; and Old Panama  (the site of Henry Morgan's 1670 raid) have been analyzed to provide additional information about pirates and their interactions with the rest of the Atlantic world.

Pirates in dime novels
The dime novel is sensationalist fiction originating in the 1860s. Irwin P. Beadle & Company standardized the books into a format that contemporary readers could easily identify at newsstands and in book catalogs. They had a yellowish orange cover that often feature a woodcut illustration. Dime novels were very popular with a wide readership. During the Civil War Beadle & Company shipped the books by the crate to the army and by mid-1965 they had published between 35,000–80,000 copies.  There are several comprehensive indices of published titles, but the most prominent is the work of Albert Johannsen. This is a two volume work with detailed information and the publishers Beadle and Adams, lists of titles and authorial biographies. Popular themes for dime novels included stories of the Wild West, the American Revolution, Indians, and Pirates.

A sampling of some pirate dime novels:
 Cavendish, Harry. The Reefer of '76; or, the Cruise of the Fire-Fly. New York: Beadle and Company Publishers, 1869.
 Henderson, Stanley J. Kidnapped; or, the Free Rangers of the Coosaw: A Tale of 1781. New York: Beadle and Company, 1866.
 Hungerford, James. The Falcon Rover. New York: Beadle and Company Publishers, 1866.
 Paulding, Decatur. The Brigantine; or, Admiral Lowe's Last Cruise. New York: Beadle and Company Publishers, 1864.
 Starbuck, Roger. The Specter Skipper; or, The Sunken Will. New York: Beadle and Company Publishers, 1869.
 Whitehead, Captain. The Ocean Rovers; or, The Freebooters of the Isles: A Thrilling Romance of the Land and Sea. New York: George
 Munro & Company, 1867.
 Whitehead, Captain. The Scourge of the Seas; or, The Outlaw's Bride. New York: George Munro & Company, 1864.

The Whydah galley: slave ship to pirate ship

Built in London in 1715, the Whydah Gally was a 300-ton galley originally commissioned for use in the slave trade.  The Whydah left on her maiden voyage to the coast of Africa in 1716. After selling a cargo of slaves to in Jamaica, the Whydah was heading home to London with a new cargo of gold and silver when she was captured by Black Sam Bellamy in 1717. In the spring of 1717, Sam Bellamy and his crew sailed North with the intent to clean the ship, divide the spoils and determine the future of the crew. The Whydah was caught in a storm and capsized off the coast of Cape Cod. The Whydah was rediscovered in 1984 by Barry Clifford, a salvage diver and Cape Cod native.

Controversy
Controversy surrounded the Whydah long before Clifford brought up the first artifacts. In 1982 the state of Massachusetts filed a claim of ownership on the Whydah treasure. After a long battle through a succession of courts, sole ownership of the Whydah was granted to Clifford in 1988. This was only the beginning of the troubles for the Whydah artifacts. New troubles arose when Silver Screen Entertainment directors, Tom Bernstein and Roland Betts proposed the concept for developing a large-scale museum complex devoted to the Whydah. The museum was offered to the city of Boston, where controversy surrounding the Whydah's history as a slave ship had already made waves with local government officials. The proposal for the museum included plans for a full-scale replica of the ship, a holographic image of Sam Bellamy, a conservation viewing area, interpretation of artifacts, a play acting out pirate hangings, and an exploration of the Whydah's history as a slave ship. Concern was raised that a "theme park" was being built around the concept of a slave ship. State representative Byron Rushing compared this concept to building a "theme park based on a concentration camp." Ultimately developers Bernstein and Betts decided that the political atmosphere of Boston was to unsteady on the issue. Having ended negotiations with Boston, Bernstein and Betts looked to Tampa as a possible location for the complex.
	
The Tampa debate unwound in a similar manner to the one in Boston. Opposition to the Whydah complex was spearheaded by Tampa Lawyer Warren Dawson, who voiced concerns that slavery was trivialized through an association with piracy. A panel of historians was convened to discuss the issue of interpreting the Whydah's slave history. After careful review of the project the panel decided that the Whydah complex could effectively interpret slavery, but the decision created more controversy from the public.  After months of negotiations and compromises the Tampa community was still divided over the potential implications of a Whydah museum. In mid-July 1993, the developers officially announced that they were pulling the project from Tampa.

The Tampa community's feelings about the Whydah have mellowed little. In 2006 the controversy flared again when the Museum of Science and Industry (MOSI) attempted to host the traveling exhibit of the Whydah artifacts sponsored by National Geographic. After several conferences with area leaders, MOSI decided not to host the exhibit. Philip Levy argues that the Whydah exhibit would have provided opportunity to explore connections between Atlantic pirates and slavery. The actions of Atlantic pirates, who often attacked slave ships and forts, created a crisis in the transatlantic slave trade. These actions were so detrimental that they led European authorities on both sides of the Atlantic to view pirates as a "fearsome enemy" and a "great threat."

Pirates as historical subject
On the subject of piracy, writings in the nineteenth century mostly consisted of the reprinting of source materials with little, if any commentary or interpretation.  Reprinting ensured that historians remained objective, and that the grand pirate narratives remained intact. The big names of buccaneers and pirates like Captain Morgan and Blackbeard were major players in those stories.  In the first part of the twentieth century, scholars who did not present faithful reprints published books on piracy that were little more than rewriting the same well-known stories.

The evolution of the history of piracy mirrors that of many other subjects.  As historians began to stray from the strict retelling of these stories, piracy became more significant. In the latter part of the twentieth century, historians began to see the Atlantic World in early modern times as an important frame in telling stories of colonialism, capitalism, slavery, and modernity.

In recent historiographical works, pirates have been viewed through various lenses. Modern scholars have posited many reasons for the rise in piracy in the early eighteenth century, from a growing social emphasis on economics and capitalism to rebellion against an oppressive upper class. Recent academic books on piracy in the Atlantic World focus on the pirates and their relationships with the wider world.

See also
Thalassocracy
Atlantic history
Atlantic World

Footnotes

Further reading

 Guy Chet, The Ocean is a Wilderness: Atlantic Piracy and the Limits of State Authority, 1688-1856. Amherst, MA: University of Massachusetts Press, 2014.

External links
 Piracy worries in pirate pursuit Blackbeard, Baltimore Sun
 Battle Over Shipwreck Photos Brews in N.C., Courthouse News
 Plunder disputes plague the wreck of Blackbeard’s ship, Soundings
 Blackbeard's Ship Confirmed off North Carolina National Geographic News

 
Maritime folklore